Rosemary Bailey (born 1953) was a British writer. She writes travel memoirs about France. In 2008 Bailey won the British Guild of Travel Writers' award for best narrative travel book, Love and War in the Pyrenees.

Early life and education
Bailey was born in Halifax, West Yorkshire in 1953, daughter of the Baptist minister Rev Walter Bailey. In 1959 the family moved to Birkenhead, near Liverpool, and then to Newcastle-under-Lyme where she attended Clayton Hall Grammar School. She then attended the University of Bristol, taking a degree in English and Philosophy. Rosemary Bailey is a member of the British Guild of Travel Writers, the Society of Authors and a Fellow of the Royal Literary Fund.

Career 
After a year on a farm in Somerset Bailey moved to London as a researcher with The Daily Telegraph Information Service, then spent three years training as journalist with Haymarket Publications on Engineering Today. She followed that by several years as a freelance journalist in London and New York City, writing about travel, women's issues, food, fashion and literary matters for The Guardian, The Sunday Times, The Independent, Elle, Vogue and others. She has edited and written travel guides to New York, Italy, but mainly France, for Time Out, Insight Guides, Dorling Kindersley and National Geographic Traveler.

In 1997 Bailey published Scarlet Ribbons: A Priest with Aids, the story of her brother, Rev Simon Bailey, an Anglican priest, who remained supported in his Yorkshire parish of Dinnington until he died in 1995. A new edition of Scarlet Ribbons was published in 2017 to considerable acclaim, including the BBC Radio 4 broadcast A priest with AIDS. on 23 July 2017. Between 1997 and 2005 Bailey was based mainly in Southern France, as described in her second book, Life in a Postcard.

Subsequent books explored the Pyrenees further, The Man who Married a Mountain (2005) about a 19th-century mountaineer, Sir Henry Russell-Killough, and the award-winning Love and War in the Pyrenees about World War II in the region, Camp de Rivesaltes, described by The Jewish Chronicle as "a quiet triumph of historical reconstruction."

Later career
Bailey is a writing tutor for the Arvon Foundation, a contributor to Jewish Book Week and between 2010-2012 and 2014-2015 a Fellow of the Royal Literary Fund at Queen Mary University of London.

Personal life
Bailey is married to author Barry Miles, and they have one son.

Publications

Books

Travel guides 
 Dorling Kindersley Eyewitness Guide to France. (Editor and contributor)
 Insight Guides to Tuscany, the Loire Valley,  Burgundy, the Côte d'Azur and Southwest France (Editor and contributor) 
 National Geographic Traveler Guide to France. (Author)
 Time Out (magazine) Guide to South of France. (contributor)

Awards 
 British Guild of Travel Writers' award for best narrative travel book 2008. (Love and War in the Pyrenees) 
 British Guild of Travel Writers award for best European travel article 2006.
 ABTOF (Association of Tour Operators to France) award for best travel article 2008. 
 Awarded grant from Francis Head Bequest 2006

References

External links 

British women travel writers
British travel writers
1953 births
Living people
People from Halifax, West Yorkshire
Alumni of the University of Bristol
20th-century British writers
20th-century British women writers
21st-century British writers
21st-century British women writers